"Forty Days and Nights" is a song recorded by Canadian music group The Rankin Family. It was released in 1996 as the third single from their fourth studio album, Endless Seasons. It peaked in the top 20 on the RPM Country Tracks chart.

Chart performance

Year-end charts

References

1995 songs
1996 singles
The Rankin Family songs
EMI Records singles
Songs written by Jimmy Rankin